The Communauté de communes du Doullennais  is a former communauté de communes in the Somme département and in the  Picardie région of France. It was created in December 1992. It was merged into the new Communauté de communes du Territoire Nord Picardie in January 2017.

Composition 
This Communauté de communes comprised 18 communes:

Authieule
Barly
Beauquesne
Beauval
Bouquemaison
Brévillers
Doullens
Gézaincourt
Grouches-Luchuel
Hem-Hardinval
Humbercourt
Longuevillette
Lucheux
Neuvillette
Occoches
Outrebois
Remaisnil
Terramesnil

See also 
Communes of the Somme department

References 

Doullennais